The National Counter Terrorism Authority (NACTA), commonly called Nacta, is a Pakistani internal security organization responsible for making counter terrorism and counter extremism policies and strategies. It also develops action plans against terrorism and extremism and reviews their implementation. It is mandated to devise a counter-terrorism strategy that should address short, medium and long-term goals and devise action plans for their implementation. It formulates threat assessments with periodic reviews. It advises the Federal Government on making adequate and timely efforts to counter terrorism and extremism. 

NACTA was initially set up in 2008, administratively, but its powers and mandate has been clearly spelled out in March 2013, under an Act of Parliament called NACTA Act 2013. The NACTA 2013 Act sets up the framework of the organization.

Board of Governors
Under the NACTA Act, the National Counter Terrorism Authority is to be governed by a Board of Governors (BOG). The Federal Interior Minister is the Chairman of NACTA BOG.  Secretaries Interior, Defense, Law & Finance, DG IB, DG FIA and DGs ISI & MI, Provincial Home secretaries and Provincial IGs are Members of NACTA's BOG with two members from National Assembly & two members from senate one each from Treasury & Opposition. National Coordinator NACTA is Secretary to the BOG. He is also Chief Executive of NACTA. Board provides strategic vision to Authority and oversees its functions. It also approves annual budget of the Authority. An Executive Committee is convened by the National Coordinator to perform such functions as assigned to it by the Board.

Functions
According to the law the Authority has the following functions:

 to receive and collate data or information or intelligence, and disseminate and coordinate between all relevant stakeholders to formulate threat assessments with periodical reviews to be presented to the Federal Government for making adequate and timely efforts to counter terrorism and extremism;
 to coordinate and prepare comprehensive National counter terrorism and counter extremism strategies, and reviews them on periodical basis;
 to develop action plans against terrorism and extremism and report to the Federal Government about implementation of these plans, on periodical basis;
 to carry out research on topics relevant to terrorism and extremism and to prepare and circulate documents;
 to carry out liaison with international entities for facilitating cooperation in areas relating to terrorism and extremism;
 to review relevant laws and suggest amendments to the Federal Government; and
 to appoint committee of experts from Government and non-Government organizations for deliberations in areas related to the mandate and functions of the Authority.

See also
 Counter Terrorism Department (Pakistan)
 List of terrorist organisations banned in Pakistan
 Rangers Anti-Terrorism Wing

References

External links 
 – Official website

2009 establishments in Pakistan
Law enforcement in Pakistan
Regulatory authorities of Pakistan
Non-military counterterrorist organizations
Pakistani intelligence agencies
Government agencies established in 2009
Counterterrorism in Pakistan